Edward D. Green (1865 - ?) was an American politician and businessman. He represented the 1st District, as a Republican in the Illinois House of Representatives from 1905 to 1907 and from 1911 to 1913. During his first term, he was the only African-American to serve in the House.

Early life, education and career

Edward D. Green was born in Pennsylvania in 1865. His parents were Maudline and Jonathan Green. By 1867, the family was living in St. Louis, Missouri. He attended Sumner High School in St. Louis.

Green was a member of the Knights of Pythias. In 1904, he organized the national commercial department of the organization. He was also a Methodist and a member of the Appomattox Club.

In 1911, Green moved to Chicago, Illinois and lived in the Bronzeville neighborhood.

Politics and life

Upon arriving in Chicago in 1911, Green began working in the real estate business. He worked as a secretary at the Northern Assets Realization Company. As of 1915, Green was unmarried. He continued to be a member of the Knights of Pythias, serving as secretary for the national organization and secretary for the organization's Pythian Temple Sanitarium Commission.

Illinois House of Representatives

Green served two separate terms, 1905–07 and 1911–13, in the Illinois House of Representatives as a Republican. During his first term, he was the only African-American to serve in the House.

During his first term, he introduced a bill to ban the numbers game. He successfully introduced a bill that passed to stop discrimination in burial lot prices in cemeteries based on race. He also introduced successful anti-lynching and anti-mob bills.

He ran for Illinois State Senate Democratic nomination for the 3rd district in 1910. During his election, The Broad Ax, which endorsed Green, said he "stands in the estimation of the best Colored people in Chicago." He did not win the nomination.

He ran for re-election for a third term in 1912 and did not win election. A white man was elected instead. It became the first time a Black person had not served in the Illinois State Legislature since 1880.

Further reading
Walton, H., Puckett, S. C., & Deskins, D. R. (2012). Chapter 19: african american voters and electoral empowerment in the north, 1876–1944: a mobilizer of the re-enfranchisement drive in the south. In The African American Electorate: A Statistical History (pp. 390–409). CQ Press.

References

1867 births
Republican Party members of the Illinois House of Representatives
19th-century African-American politicians
19th-century American politicians
Year of death missing
African-American men in politics
People from St. Louis
Knights of Pythias
American real estate businesspeople
20th-century American businesspeople
Businesspeople from Chicago
African-American businesspeople
Politicians from Chicago
African-American Methodists
American anti-lynching activists